Würzburg is a city in Bavaria, Germany.

Würzburg may also refer to:

People 
 Adalbero of Würzburg (or Saint Adalbero) (c. 1010–1090), Bishop of Würzburg and Count of Lambach-Wels
 Burchard of Würzburg (in German Burkard or Burkhard; died c. 750), Anglo-Saxon missionary 
 John of Würzburg (Latin Johannes Herbipolensis), German priest who made a pilgrimage to the Holy Land in the 1160s 
 Veit von Würzburg (1519–1577), Prince-Bishop of Bamberg

Other uses
 Würzburg (district), a Landkreis Bavaria, Germany
 Würzburg radar, a German radar system during World War II

See also 
 
 Würzburg Abbey (disambiguation)
 Wurzburger (disambiguation)
 Marienkirche, Würzburg, a chapel in Marienberg Fortress, Würzburg, Bavaria
 Hochschule für Musik Würzburg (University of Music, Würzburg)
 Mainfranken Theater Würzburg, a theatre in Würzburg, Germany
 Museum im Kulturspeicher Würzburg, a municipal art museum